The Lower Sepik a.k.a. Nor–Pondo languages are a small language family of East Sepik Province in northern Papua New Guinea. They were identified as a family by K Laumann in 1951 under the name Nor–Pondo, and included in Donald Laycock's now-defunct 1973 Sepik–Ramu family.

Classification
The original conception of the family, under the name Nor–Pondo, is as follows:

Malcolm Ross (2005) broke up the Nor branch (and thus renamed the family Lower Sepik) because Murik does not share the characteristic s of the first- and second-person pronouns of Kopar and the Pondo languages, so the latter may form a group: Murik vs Kopar–Pondo. Ross classified Lower Sepik as one branch of a Ramu–Lower Sepik language family.

Foley (2005) tentatively proposes that Chambri and Angoram may be primary branches: Nor, Chambari, Karawari–Yimas, Angoram. Usher, following Foley, keeps Nor together and breaks up Pondo. Neither accept the connection to Ramu.

Foley (2018) and Usher (2020)
Foley (2018) and Usher (2020) agree on the following classification.

Lower Sepik family
Kopar–Murik (Nor)
Murik
Kopar
Angoram
Chambri
Karawari–Yimas 
Karawari
Yimas

Foley notes that Angoram appears to be closer to Murik–Kopar, and Chambri to Karawari–Yimas, but Foley (2018: 213) leaves them as separate branches pending further evidence.

Phonology
Except for Yimas-Karawari, Lower Sepik languages typically have the following six-vowel system.

{| 
| i ||  || u
|-
| e || ə || o
|-
| a ||  || 
|}

Yimas-Karawari has only four vowels.

{| 
| i || u
|-
| ə || 
|-
| a || 
|}

Proto-language

Pronouns
The pronouns reconstructed for the proto-language are,

Proto–Lower Sepik (Ross)

{| class=wikitable
|-
| I || *ama || we two || *ka-i, *ka-pia || we few || *(p)a-ŋk-i-t || we all || *a-i, *a-pia, *i-pi
|-
| thou || *nɨmi || you two || *ka-u, *ka-pua || you few || *(p)a-ŋk-u-t || you all || *a-u, *a-pu, *i-pu(a)
|-
| s/he || *mɨn || they two || *mɨnɨmp ? (M),*mpɨ ? (F) || they few || *mɨŋkɨ-t || they all || *mump (M),*pum (F)
|}

Proto-Nor–Pondo (Foley)
{| class=wikitable
|-
| I || *ama || we two || *ka-i, *ka-pa-i || we few || *(pa)ŋk-it || we all || *a-i, *a-pa-i, *(y)i-i, *(y)i-pa-i
|-
| thou || *mi || you two || *ka-u, *ka-pa-u || you few || *(pa)ŋk-ut || you all || *a-u, *a-pa-u, *(y)i-u, *(y)i-pa-u
|-
| s/he || *mən || they two || ? || they few || *mɨŋkɨ || they all || *mump ?
|}

Lexicon
A phonological reconstruction of proto-Lower Sepik has been proposed by Foley (2005). Foley's (2005) lexical reconstructions are provided below.

Proto-Lower Sepik reconstructions by Foley (2005)

{| class="wikitable sortable"
! gloss !! proto-Lower Sepik !! Yimas !! Karawi !! Chambri !! Angrm !! Murik !! Kopar
|-
| one || *mb(w)ia- || mpa- || mba- || mbwia- || mbia- || abe || mbatep
|-
| two || *ri-pa- || -rpal || ripay || -ri || -(lɨ)par || kobo || kombari
|-
| three || *-ram || -ramnaw || -rianmaw || -ram || -elɨm || keroŋgo || keremɨŋ
|-
| person || *nor || nar-maŋ || yarmasɨnar || noranan ||  || nor || nor
|-
| male || *pon || panmal || panmari ||  || pondo || puin || 
|-
| woman || *ŋay || ŋay || asay || kaye || nuŋor || ŋai || nana
|-
| water || *arɨm || arɨm || arɨm || arɨm || alɨm || arɨm || arɨm
|-
| fire || *awr || awt || awi || ayɨr || aluŋ || awr || awr
|-
| sun ||  || tɨmal || sɨmari || sɨnmari || mbwino || akɨn || akɨn
|-
| moon || *m(w)il ? || mɨla || tuŋkwi || mwɨl || mɨle || karewan || karep
|-
| star ||  || awak || suŋkwiɲcirim || suŋgwi || areɲjo || moai || kinaŋ
|-
| canoe || *kay || kay || kay || ke || ke || gain || kain
|-
| house ||  || nam || yam || kurɨr || nam || iran || indan
|-
| village || *num || num || imuŋka || num || num || nomot || numot
|-
| breast || *nɨŋgay || nɨŋay || ɲjay || nɨŋke || ŋge || niŋgen || niŋgin
|-
| tooth || *sisiŋk ? || tɨrɨŋ || sɨsɨŋ || sraŋk || sisiŋ || asarap || asirap
|-
| blood || *ya- || yat || yay || yari || ayakone || yaran || yuwaran
|-
| bone || *sariŋamp || tanɨm || tanɨm || anamp || salɨŋ || sariŋib̩ || sarekimp
|-
| tongue || *minɨŋ || mɨɲɨŋ || mumɨɲɨŋ || tɨbulaniŋk || mɨnɨŋ || menɨŋ || mimiŋ
|-
| eye || *tambri || tuŋkuruŋ || sampɨs || sɨsiŋk || tambli || nabrin || nambrin
|-
| nose ||  || tɨkay || ipun || wambusu || naŋɨm || daur || imbot
|-
| leg || *namuŋk || pamuŋ || pamuŋ || namaŋk || namuŋ ||  || namɨŋ
|-
| hair ||  || wapwi || wampi || yawi || mbwikmaley || dwar || ruar
|-
| ear || *kwand- || kwantumuŋ || kwandukas || kukunam || kwandum || karekep || kundot
|-
| egg || *awŋ || awŋ || yawŋ || awŋk || awŋ || gaug || awŋ
|-
| leaf || *nɨmpramp || nɨmprɨm || yimprɨm || nɨmpramp || namblum || nabirɨk || nɨmbiraŋ
|-
| yesterday / tomorrow || *ŋarɨŋ || ŋarɨŋ || arɨŋ || namasɨnɨŋ || nakɨmɨn || ŋarɨŋ || rari
|-
| oar || *(mɨ)naŋ || muraŋ || mɨnaŋ || naŋk || inap || inaŋ || naŋ
|-
| betelnut || *poruŋ || patn || payn || muntɨkɨn || parɨŋ || porog || puruŋ
|-
| lime || *awi(r) || awi || as || ayɨr || awer || air || air
|-
| pig || *numpran || numpran || impian || numpran || imbar || nɨmbren || nɨmbren
|-
| crocodile ||  || manpa || manpo || ayi || walami || oramen || uri
|-
| snake || *wakɨn || wakɨn || wakɨn || wan || paruŋ || wakɨn || ikun
|-
| mosquito || *naŋgun || naŋkun || yaŋkun || naŋgun || wawarɨn || nauk || nangɨt
|-
| ground || *andi || anti || anti || nɨŋkrump || andi || agin || andin
|-
| feces || *mɨndi || mɨlɨm || mɨnti || muɲjar || mɨndi || mɨndɨn || mɨndɨ
|-
| hear || *and- || andɨ || andu || andɨ || andɨ || dɨn || nda
|-
| hit || *di || tupul || kurar || dɨɨ || ti || di || nɨŋ
|-
| eat || *am(b) || am(b) || am(b) || am(b) || am(b) || mɨn || ma
|-
| go || *wa || wa || kuria || kal || wa || on || wa
|-
| come || *ya || ya || kurapia || ya || ya || ya || ya
|-
| sit || *sa || tay || sa || nda ||  || sa || nda
|-
| big || *kupa || kɨpa || kupa || wupa || kupa || apo || kapu
|-
| cold || *sarV- || tarɨk || sarɨk || saruk || popant ||  || sarapakin
|}

For comparisons with the language isolate Tayap, see Tayap language#Classification.

Footnotes

Further reading

Proto-Lower-Sepik. TransNewGuinea.org. From (1) Foley, W.A. 1986. The Papuan languages of New Guinea, Cambridge: Cambridge University Press. ; (2) Foley, W.A. 1986. The Papuan languages of New Guinea, Cambridge: Cambridge University Press.
Abbott, S. "Nor-Pondo lexicostatistical survey". In Adams, K., Lauck, L., Miedema, J., Welling, F., Stokhof, W., Flassy, D., Oguri, H., Collier, K., Gregerson, K., Phinnemore, T., Scorza, D., Davies, J., Comrie, B. and Abbott, S. editors, Papers in New Guinea Linguistics No. 22. A-63:313-338. Pacific Linguistics, The Australian National University, 1985.

References

 
Ramu–Lower Sepik languages
Languages of East Sepik Province
Papuan languages
Language families